Harry Paul Bailey (1913 - 15 December 1979) was professor of earth sciences at University of California, Riverside. He collaborated with Daniel I. Axelrod, combining his own climatological work with Axelrod's paleobotanical research. He was a Guggenheim fellow in 1958.

Selected publications
The climate of Southern California. University of California Press, Berkeley & Los Angeles, 1966. (California natural history guides No. 17) ISBN

References 

1913 births
1979 deaths
Educators from Allentown, Pennsylvania
Scientists from Allentown, Pennsylvania
University of California, Riverside faculty
American earth scientists
University of California alumni
United States Army Air Forces officers
Military personnel from Pennsylvania